A Day in the Life of Bonnie and Clyde is a 1968 studio album by Mel Tormé. It was released during a wave of renewed interest in the crime duo Bonnie and Clyde following the release of the 1967 film Bonnie and Clyde. With the exception of the title track, an original song by Tormé, the album mostly consists of covers of popular songs from the late 1920s and early 1930s, around the period when the real-life Bonnie and Clyde were committing their bank robberies. (Another exception is "I Concentrate on You", a Cole Porter song from 1940.)

Track listing

Personnel 
 Mel Tormé – vocals
 John Audino – trumpet
 Buddy Childers
 Frank Rosolino – trombone
 Georgie Auld – saxophone
 Bill Green
 Dave Pell
 Mike Deasy – guitar
 Herb Ellis
 Barney Kessel
 Ray Pohlman – double bass
 Eugene Dinovi – Hammond organ, piano
 John Cyr – drums
 Lincoln Mayorga – arranger

References

1968 albums
Mel Tormé albums
Liberty Records albums
Albums arranged by Lincoln Mayorga
Depictions of Bonnie and Clyde in music